Gaer hillfort (Welsh: Bryngaer Croes Trelech) is a Celtic Iron Age hillfort near Trellech in Monmouthshire, Wales.

This fort was registered by Cadw and is identified with the number SAM: MM077.  There are approximately 300 hillforts in CADW's list of monuments, although archaeologists believe there were nearly 600 in total.

See also
List of hillforts in Wales

References

Hillforts in Monmouthshire